Guo Yiqi (born 13 February 1997) is a Chinese fencer. She competed in the women's team sabre event at the 2020 Summer Olympics.

References

External links
 

1997 births
Living people
Chinese female fencers
Olympic fencers of China
Fencers at the 2020 Summer Olympics
Place of birth missing (living people)
21st-century Chinese women